The Cape cormorant or Cape shag (Phalacrocorax capensis) is a bird endemic to the southwestern coasts of Africa.

It breeds from Namibia south to southern Western Cape. In the nonbreeding season, it may be found as far north as the mouth of the Congo, and also extends up the east coast of South Africa as far as Mozambique.  In the 1970s, the breeding population was estimated as over 1 million in Namibia alone.  However, the IUCN now classifies it as "Endangered" due to a very rapid decline in the population over the last three generations.

The Cape cormorant is an almost entirely glossy black bird, though in breeding condition it has a purplish tinge and a few white plumes on head, neck, and cloacal areas.  Its gular skin is a deep orangey yellow; unusually for a cormorant, its lores are feathered.  The bird's wing is about 240–280 mm in extent, and it weighs 800–1600 grams, with little sexual dimorphism.

Cape shags commonly forage in flocks, taking schooling fish from mid-water, such as pilchards, anchovies, and sand eels. Its prey are typically much smaller than those of the sympatric bank cormorant.  Their major predators are black-backed jackals, which take the occasional adult while it is roosting, and nest-site predators such as great cormorants, eastern great white pelicans, and kelp gulls.

Like a number of other related cormorant species, the Cape cormorant is placed by some authorities (e.g. Johnsgaard) in the genus Leucocarbo.

Gallery

References

Johnsgaard, P.A. (1993).  Cormorants, darters, and pelicans of the world.  Washington DC: Smithsonian Institution Press.

External links

 Cape Cormorant page from the Animal Demography Unit at the University of Cape Town
 Cape Cormorant - Species text in The Atlas of Southern African Birds.

Cape cormorant
Birds of Southern Africa
Cape cormorant